Cream soda (also known as creme soda or creaming soda) is a sweet soft drink. Generally flavored with vanilla and based on the taste of an Ice cream float, a wide range of variations can be found worldwide.

History and development
A recipe for cream soda written by E. M. Sheldon and published in Michigan Farmer in 1852 called for water, cream of tartar (potassium bitartrate), Epsom salts, sugar, egg, and milk, to be mixed, then heated, and mixed when cool with water and a quarter teaspoonful of baking soda (sodium bicarbonate) to make an effervescent drink. It was suggested as a temperance drink preferable to those of "Uncle Bacchus" and in compliance with the recently introduced Maine law.

Alexander C. Howell, of Vienna, New Jersey, was granted a patent for "cream soda-water" on June 27, 1865. Howell's cream soda-water was made with sodium bicarbonate, water, sugar, egg whites, wheat flour, and "any of the usual flavoring materials—such as oil of lemon, extracts of vanilla, pine-apple, to suit the taste". Before drinking, the cream soda-water was mixed with water and an acid such as tartaric acid or citric acid. In Canada, James William Black of Berwick, Nova Scotia, was granted a U.S. patent on December 8, 1885, and a Canadian patent on July 5, 1886, for "ice-cream soda". Black's ice-cream soda, which contained whipped egg whites, sugar, lime juice, lemons, citric acid, flavoring, and bicarbonate of soda, was a concentrated syrup that could be reconstituted into an effervescent beverage by adding ordinary ice water.

International variations

North and South America

United States

In the United States, cream soda is often vanilla-flavored and is either clear or colored a light golden brown. Red, pink, orange, and blue colored variants of the plain soda are also made.

Popular brands include: 
 AriZona Soda Shaq
 A-Treat Cream Soda
 A&W Vanilla Cream Soda
 Barq's Red Creme Soda
 Big Red
 Blue Sky
 Boylan's Creme Vanilla
 Big Shot Cream Soda (New Orleans area)
 Canfield's Swiss Creme (mainly in the Chicago area)
 Dad's Cream Soda
 Dang! That's Good Red Cream Soda
 Dr Pepper Vanilla Float 
 Dr Pepper Cream Soda (Sold as Dr Pepper & Cream Soda, a mix of both beverages)
 Dr. Brown's (mainly in the New York City area, but also kosher delicatessens across the country)
 Faygo
 Fitz's Cream Soda and Cardinal Cream (St. Louis Area)
 Foxon Park (mainly in Connecticut)
 Hosmer Mountain (mainly in Connecticut)
 Henry Weinhard's Cream Soda
 IBC
 Jones Soda
 Jelly Belly French Vanilla Cream Soda
 Mug Cream Soda
 Original New York Seltzer Vanilla Cream Soda
Pepsi Cream Soda
 Polar Beverages Cream Soda
 Shasta Creme Soda
 SodaStream Cream Soda Syrup
 Sprecher Brewery
 Stewart's
 Vess (Old St. Louis variety that is a deep pink)
 Virgil's Cream Soda
 White Rock Beverages
 Zevia

Another variety is referred to as Italian cream soda. Despite the name, this drink originated in the US, not in Italy. The name is due to it being a form of Italian soda. Italian cream soda is usually made of a mixture of carbonated water, vanilla syrup, and added half and half or cream. Ratios vary widely, but the taste is usually that of sweetened, flavored milk.

Canada
In Canada, cream soda is mostly pink (except in Quebec and Newfoundland, where it is sold clear). Some brands, such as Fanta, market a colourless version. Many brands have a long-lasting, foamy head.

Brands include: 
 Barq's Cream Soda - colourless
 Big 8 Cream Soda
 Cott Cream Soda
 Crush 
 Fanta
 Jones Soda
 Kiri Cream Soda – colourless
 Life Brand
 The Pop Shoppe - also markets a vodka-based alcoholic version
 President's Choice
 Walmart Canada – US-style vanilla flavour

Some American brands are available in Canada as imports.

Caribbean and Latin America
Cream soda is usually served as a "red pop", particularly Fanta's Red Cream Soda. Champagne cola (also spelled "kola"), a soft drink similar to cream soda, is ubiquitous across the region. In the Caribbean there are several popular brands of clear, vanilla-flavoured cream soda.

 Bigga (Jamaica) 
 Crema Soda (El Salvador)
 DG Soft Drink Cream Soda (Jamaica)
 Frescolita (Venezuela) - a bubble gum-flavored soda
 Inca Kola (Peru) - sometimes considered a champagne cola, sometimes considered its own drink
 Old Jamaica Cream Soda (Jamaica) 
 Solo Beverage Company (Trinidad)
 ToniCol (Mexico) – a naturally flavored vanilla soda

Oceania

Australia

In Australia, two distinctly different flavoured sodas exist. Creamy soda or brown cream soda is vanilla flavoured, whereas creaming soda refers to a pink soft drink also featuring vanilla flavours produced by Kirks, Bundaberg, and Bickford's, among other brands. Another local variant produced by Golden Circle is vanilla and fruit-flavoured, and coloured yellow to distinguish it from existing brands. More traditional brown varieties are also available, but less common. Brands include Kirks' Sno Drop (only available in South Australia, Victoria, and the Northern Territory), Tarax, River Port, Saxby's, Bert's Snowette (the original recipe of Shelley's Snowcap (Snowcap Champagne) before the line was acquired) and Schweppes, which also produce a red variety as part of its "Traditionals" range.

The term "creaming soda" is generally used to refer to the drink itself, the combination of soda and ice-cream is called a spider.

New Zealand
This is known as creaming soda, ice cream soda, chill drink, or cream soda, though the flavour changes are negligible. It is usually a bright yellow colour or a white opaque. It is one of the many flavours sold by Foxton Fizz. It is also one of the many carbonated drink-flavours offered by Golden Circle.

Europe

Netherlands
A brand called UGGO is sold in the Netherlands. There is a wide variety of tastes available. Asian (especially Chinese) supermarkets also sell Schweppes Cream Soda, which is imported from Hong Kong. A&W is sold in some supermarkets.

Ireland
Ireland has a brand of clear vanilla-flavoured cream soda called Country Spring.. Cream Soda made by A.G. Barr is also widely sold and consumed there.

United Kingdom
In the UK, A.G. Barr and Ben Shaw's (a Cott brand), manufacture their own brands of cream soda, which are both clear and vanilla-flavoured and some supermarket chains sell it under their respective own brands.

Finland
A brand called Sun'n Cream Soda is made by Finnish brewery Nokian Panimo. They also have a variation called Orange Cream Soda, with a hint of orange taste.

Asia

In Hong Kong, the Swire Coca-Cola Company markets a yellow Schweppes Cream Soda. Some people enjoy cream soda in a 1:1 ratio with fresh milk.

In Japan, "cream soda" (クリームソーダ) is a term used for an ice cream float made with melon-flavored soda (メロンソーダ) topped with a scoop of vanilla ice cream.

In Malaysia, the F&N or Fraser and Neave brand makes a clear ice cream soda.

Pakistan's popular brand is Pakola Ice Cream Soda, which is green in color.

In Sri Lanka, Elephant House Cream Soda is the most popular soft drink. Coca-Cola Beverages Sri Lanka launched their newest flavor, Fanta Cream Soda, in July 2009.  
 
In Thailand, Hale's Trading produces Hale's Blue Boy Brand Cream Soda Flavoured Syrup, a green colored, rose/floral flavored cordial. This is mixed 1 part to 4 parts water/soda water to get a cream soda drink, very similar to the South African Creme Soda, or is used as a flavoring in their shaved-ice desserts. This syrup is sold worldwide in some Asian food stores. PepsiCo's division in Thailand produces a green, cream-flavored soda under their brand name Mirinda.

In some Arabian countries, Canada Dry offers a cream soda flavor.

Africa

In South Africa, Eswatini, and Zimbabwe, cream soda is sold under the label Sparletta Creme Soda, a product of the Coca-Cola company. It is green in color.

See also

 Vanilla Coke
Dr. Pepper
Root beer
List of brand name soft drinks products
 List of soft drink flavors

References

Soft drinks
!